Sirimane Falls is one among the many waterfalls of the Western Ghats of Karnataka.

Location
Sirimane Falls is located at a distance of 5 km from Kigga near Sringeri, a popular pilgrim center. Nearest Airport is Mangalore and nearest Railway stations are Udupi (96 KM) and Shimoga (114 KM).

Kigga, a small village which houses the beautiful waterfalls is about 10 km from Sringeri. Water from the falls feeds coffee estates and paddy fields downstream. 
A moderate entry fee is collected to maintain the walkways and viewpoints. The money collected also supports a small hydraulic power plant which is built adjacent to falls which lights Kigga houses. The entire activity is controlled and maintained by local bodies.

See also 
 List of waterfalls in India

References

External links 
 Sirimane Waterfalls

Waterfalls of Karnataka
Geography of Chikkamagaluru district
Tourist attractions in Chikkamagaluru district